Choi–Williams distribution function is one of the members of Cohen's class distribution function. It was first proposed by Hyung-Ill Choi and William J. Williams in 1989. This distribution function adopts exponential kernel to suppress the cross-term. However, the kernel gain does not decrease along the  axes in the ambiguity domain. Consequently, the kernel function of Choi–Williams distribution function can only filter out the cross-terms that result from the components that differ in both time and frequency center.

Mathematical definition 
The definition of the cone-shape distribution function is shown as follows:

where

and the kernel function is:

See also 
Cone-shape distribution function 
Wigner distribution function
Ambiguity function
Short-time Fourier transform

References

Time frequency analysis and wavelet transform class notes, Jian-Jiun Ding, the Department of Electrical Engineering, National Taiwan University (NTU), Taipei, Taiwan, 2007. 
S. Qian and D. Chen, Joint Time-Frequency Analysis: Methods and Applications, Chap. 5, Prentice Hall, N.J., 1996. 
H. Choi and W. J. Williams, “Improved time-frequency representation of multicomponent signals using exponential kernels,” IEEE. Trans. Acoustics, Speech, Signal Processing, vol. 37, no. 6, pp. 862–871, June 1989. 
Y. Zhao, L. E. Atlas, and R. J. Marks, “The use of cone-shape kernels for generalized time-frequency representations of nonstationary signals,” IEEE Trans. Acoustics, Speech, Signal Processing, vol. 38, no. 7, pp. 1084–1091, July 1990.

Time–frequency analysis
Transforms